Garze (Ganzi) Gesar Airport  is an airport in Garzê Tibetan Autonomous Prefecture, Sichuan, China.

The airport project received approval from the National Development and Reform Commission in October 2015, with a projected investment of 2.26 billion yuan. Construction began in June 2017, and the airport opened on 16 September 2019.

It is the third airport in Garze Prefecture, after Kangding Airport and Daocheng Yading Airport.

The airport has a 4,000-meter-long runway (class 4C). It is designed to handle 150,000 passengers per year.

Airlines and destinations

See also
List of airports in China
List of the busiest airports in China
List of highest airports

References

Airports in Sichuan
Buildings and structures in the Garzê Tibetan Autonomous Prefecture
Airports established in 2019
2019 establishments in China